Events from the year 1912 in Denmark.

Incumbents
 Monarch – Frederick VIII (until 14 May), Christian X
 Prime minister – Klaus Berntsen

Events

 17 February – The Danish Union of Press Photographers is founded as the  first national organization for newspaper photographers in the world.
  22 February – MS Selandia, the world's first ocean-going diesel-powered ship, departs Copenhagen on her maiden voyage, bound for Bangkok, with two B&W four-stroke diesel engines.
 14 May – Frederick VIII dies and his son, Christian X, becomes king of Denmark.
 15 May  The proclamation of Christian C as King of Denmark.
 5 August – The Rebild Festival is held for the first time, delayed compared to the planned date, the American Independence on July 4, due to a period of national mourning upon King Frederik VII's sudden death. The celebrations are attended by somewhere between 10,000 and 15,000 people.
 28 September – Jacob Ellehammer takes off for the first time in his self-built Ellehammer helicopter.

Culture

Music
 27 February  Carl Nielsen's Violin Concerto and Symphony No. 3 are performed in public for the first time.

Sports
 1 September  Aalborg Chang is founded.

Births
 30 January – Finn Juhl, architect and designer (d. 1989)
 18 February – Gustaf Munch-Petersen, writer and painter (d. 1938)
 14 March – Johan Jacobsen, film director (d. 1972)
 20 March – Knud Rex, actor (d. 1968)
 3 April – Kjeld Philip, economist and politician (d. 1989)
 27 April – Princess Caroline-Mathilde of Denmark, hereditary princess (d. 1995)
 4 June – Robert Jacobsen, artist (d. 1993)
 10 June – Abraham Kurland, olympic wrestler (d. 1999)
 10 September – Herluf Bidstrup, cartoonist (d. 1988)
 16 September – Sven Havsteen-Mikkelsen, painter and illustrator (d. 1999)
 22 October – Peer Guldbrandsen, screenwriter, actor, film director and producer (d. 1996)

Deaths
 12 January – Herman Bang, writer (b. 1857)
 27 January  Martha Wærn, philanthropist  (b. 1741)
 1 March – Ludvig Holstein-Ledreborg, politician, prime minister of Denmark (b. 1839)
 24 April – Eiler Rasmussen Eilersen, painter (b. 1827)
 14 May – King Frederick VIII (b. 1843)
 26 May – Louis Hasselriis, sculptor (b. 1844)
 25 November – Moses Melchior, businessman (b. 1825)

References

 
Denmark
Years of the 20th century in Denmark
1910s in Denmark
Denmark